Amos Elon  (July 4, 1926 – May 25, 2009) was an Israeli journalist and author.

Biography
Heinrich Sternbach (later Amos Elon) was born in Vienna. He immigrated to Mandate Palestine in 1933. He studied law and history in Israel and England. He  married  Beth Drexler, a New York-born literary agent, with whom he had one daughter, Danae. In the 1990s, Elon began to spend much of his time in Italy. In 2004 he moved there permanently, citing disillusionment with developments in Israel since 1967. Elon died of leukemia on May 25, 2009 in Borgo Buggiano in Tuscany, Italy, aged 82. In 2005, his daughter Danae produced a biographical film about him, entitled Another Road Home.

Journalistic career
Beginning in the 1950s, Elon served as a correspondent on European and American affairs for the newspaper Haaretz.  He took a leave of absence from Haaretz in 1971 and resumed in 1978. Elon retired from Haaretz in 2001. Elon was an early advocate for the creation of a Palestinian state and withdrawal from the territories occupied by Israel in 1967. Elon also spoke out against Armenian genocide denial and Yad Vashem's boycott of the 1982 International Conference on Holocaust and Genocide over its inclusion of the Armenian genocide.

Elon was the author of nine books. He rose to international fame in the early 1970s after publishing The Israelis: Founders and Sons, described as "an affectionate but unsparing portrait of the early Zionists". A frequent contributor to the New York Review of Books and The New York Times Magazine,  he was widely regarded as one of Israel's leading journalists for many years.

Zionism
In 1975 he wrote an admiring if critical biography of Theodor Herzl, the founder of Zionism, but later grew disillusioned. In 2004 he sold his home in Jerusalem and moved to Tuscany. In an interview that year with Ari Shavit he stated that Zionism had "exhausted itself" and that he had come to consider it  "perhaps the least successful attempt at colonialism that I can think of. This is the crappiest colonial regime that I can think of in the modern age."

Academic career
In 2007–2008, Elon was a fellow at the Center for Law and Security at New York University School of Law.

Published works
 Journey Through a Haunted Land—the new Germany
 The Israelis, Founders and Sons
 eBook version reissued by Plunkett Lake Press
 Herzl, a Biography
 eBook version reissued by Plunkett Lake Press
 Flight into Egypt
 Jerusalem: City of Mirrors (Little, Brown, 1990)
 Timetable, a novel
 Jerusalem, Battleground of Memory
 eBook version reissued by Plunkett Lake Press
 A Blood-dimmed Tide—Dispatches from the Middle East
 Founder, the first Rothschild
 eBook version reissued by Plunkett Lake Press
 The Pity of It All: A Portrait of Jews In Germany 1743–1933

References

External links 
 Under the Tuscan sun Interview with Haaretz, 2004
 
  Obituary.

1926 births
2009 deaths
Austrian emigrants to Mandatory Palestine
Deaths from cancer in Tuscany
Deaths from leukemia
Israeli emigrants to Italy
Israeli reporters and correspondents
Israeli non-fiction writers
Jewish historians
Historians of Israel
Historians of Jews and Judaism
20th-century non-fiction writers